St. Bernard's College is an independent Catholic secondary school for boys, located in the Melbourne suburb of Essendon, Victoria, Australia. The college is named after its patron saint, Bernard of Clairvaux, and is a member of the Associated Catholic Colleges. It is also part of Edmund Rice Education Australia, a series of schools that focus on teaching the pupils in the tradition of Edmund Rice.

History
St. Bernard's College traces its origins to the establishment of 'St Monica's' at Moonee Ponds in 1917, by Brothers C. O'Keefe and T. Quinn. Students at this school were taken from Grade III to Intermediate (Year 10).

In 1940, during the war period, not only were the students sent away to help in project Ireland, the school was also extended to take the Leaving Certificate (Year 11), and this necessitated the building of the first St. Bernard's on the Strand Moonee Ponds, with Brother Cregan as the first Headmaster.

In the mid-1950s, Brother Brendan Murphy organised the purchase of the West Essendon property. While initially used as sporting grounds, building work began at this site in the mid-1960s. Since then, the site has developed with all classes being located at West Essendon by 1995, at which time the Moonee Ponds site was sold. In 2001, the college set up its Santa Monica campus on the Great Ocean Road near Lorne. St Bernard's is the last known site to Tim's Shape factory.  James Hanna of the Hanna clan went on to become a fantastic boy working at the Melbourne Airport for Daifuku and driving a mad S3.

Activities

Sports
St. Bernard's is a member of the Associated Catholic Colleges and competes against twelve other schools in sporting fixtures and carnivals. Students play week-end sport with the Old Collegians. St Bernards is particularly successful in Australian Rules Football. Winning the Herald Sun Shield In the years 2017 and 2018. A number of Boys from these sides have been drafted into the AFL like Noah Balta to Richmond, Xavier O'halloran to Greater Western Sydney, (in the first round of the AFL draft) and Lachlan Sholl to Adelaide.

St Bernards has also seen success in the areas of Athletics and Cross country dominating for the last part of a decade until recent. St Bernards had the record of twelve straight Athletic championship wins from 2003-2014, under the coaching of Gerard Brown a teacher with years of experience in the role as head coach of the Athletics squad and Cross Country team.

ACC premierships 
St. Bernard's has won the following ACC premierships.

 Athletics (18) - 1988, 1989, 1990, 1991, 1992, 2001, 2003, 2004, 2005, 2006, 2007, 2008, 2009, 2010, 2011, 2012, 2013, 2014
 Basketball (2) - 1991, 2016
 Cricket (5) - 1979, 1997, 2005, 2018, 2021
 Cross Country (10) - 2005, 2006, 2007, 2008, 2009, 2011, 2012, 2013, 2014, 2015
 Football (15) - 1961, 1965, 1970, 1972, 1987, 1988, 1989, 1991, 1996, 2000, 2001, 2012, 2017, 2018, 2021
 Golf (3) - 2014, 2015, 2016
 Handball - 1956
 Hockey (7) - 2005, 2006, 2008, 2009, 2012, 2013, 2018
Lawn Bowls - 2021
 Soccer (6) - 1995, 1996, 1998, 2004, 2008, 2021
 Swimming (3) - 1995, 1998, 2012
 Table Tennis (4) - 2001, 2002, 2010, 2013
 Tennis (12) - 1952, 1954, 1991, 1997, 2001, 2004, 2007, 2008, 2009, 2016, 2018, 2019
 Triathlon - 2018
 Volleyball (4) - 1995, 1996, 1997, 2013

Performing arts
The college has a reputation for its musical productions and music programs. It has combined with St Columba's College, to stage shows annually, which have included Pirates of Penzance, Fiddler on the Roof, Anything Goes, West Side Story, Guys and Dolls, Oklahoma, Cabaret, Bye Bye Birdie, Jesus Christ Superstar, The Sound of Music, The Wiz, High School Musical, Jekyll and Hyde, Once Upon a Mattress, Shout! The Legend of The Wild One, The Pajama Game, The Boy from Oz, Joseph and the Amazing Technicolor Dreamcoat, The Addams Family and have recently finished performing The Wedding Singer. The college has many bands and quartets. The college also has an annual 'Kick Arts' along with St Columba's College and Ave Maria College which comprises dramatic, musical and dance acts by each school.

Student leadership

The students are involved in electing their student leaders every year.

A nomination from a student or from their peers is verified by the staff and senior leadership team. Staff will then endorse students from Year 11, and for specific leadership roles for Year 12 students.

The senior leadership team will then review the potential candidates based on student and staff endorsement and select the Year 11 and Year 12 members of the Student Council. The Year 12 portion of the Student Council is composed of eight council members, five House Captains, four Portfolio Captains (Arts, Sports, Ministry and Academic) and the College Captain.

Year 12 Student Council members who wish to undertake House, Portfolio, or the College Captain role must undertake an interview with the Senior Leadership Team, who will decide the student for the position.

The Student Council helps facilitates many important events throughout the College such as the College's Feast Day and various assemblies throughout the year.

Notable alumni

 Noah Balta –  Australian rules footballer for Richmond Tigers
 Jude Bolton –  Australian rules footballer for Sydney Swans
 Joseph Camilleri – Professor of International Relations, La Trobe University
 Michael Carmody – Australian Federal Commissioner of Taxation
 Ben Carroll – Labor Politician
 Jordan Schroder –  Australian rules footballer for Geelong Cats
 Joe Daniher –  Australian rules footballer for Essendon Bombers; son of Anthony Daniher
 Garry Foulds – former Australian rules footballer for Essendon Bombers
 Andrew Johnston –  Australian rules footballer for Fitzroy 
 Brad Lloyd – former Australian rules footballer for Hawthorn Hawks
 Matthew Lloyd – Australian rules footballer for Essendon Bombers
 Francis Leach – Australian radio personality & sports commentator. Host of the drive show on SEN 1116 with fellow St Bernard's alumni David Schwarz
 Hayden Kennedy – Senior Australian Rules Football Umpire
 Patrick Kisnorbo – Socceroo
 Justin Madden – former Australian rules footballer for Carlton Blue and Essendon Bombers; former Member of the Legislative Assembly for Essendon in the Victorian Parliament
 Simon Madden – former Australian rules footballer for Essendon Bombers
 Michael Malouf – former Chief Executive Officer of City of Melbourne Council; Former Chief Executive Officer of the Carlton Football Club
 Liam McBean – Australian rules footballer for Richmond Tigers
 Brian McNamee – Director and Chair of CSL Limited
 Paul McNamee – former Davis Cup tennis player
 Brian Mannix – Singer, musician, actor, director, author
 Luke Mitchell (footballer) - Australian rules footballer
 Steven Morris –  Australian rules footballer for Richmond Tigers
 Christopher Mullins – Gold medal winning Paralympic athlete
 Xavier O'Halloran - Australian rules footballer for GWS Giants
 Peter Reilly – founder of the Ausdoc Company
 Jake Riccardi - Australian rules footballer for GWS Giants
 Ben Ronke - Australian rules footballer
 Lachlan Sholl - Australian rules footballer for Adelaide Crows
 Dane Swan –  Australian rules footballer for Collingwood Magpies
 Ziggy Switkowski – former CEO of Telstra
 Rohan Welsh – former Australian rules footballer for Carlton Blues

Notable staff
Eleni Glouftsis, the first female Australian rules football umpire

See also
List of schools in Victoria
List of high schools in Victoria
Victorian Certificate of Education

References

External links
St. Bernard's College Website

Catholic secondary schools in Melbourne
Congregation of Christian Brothers secondary schools in Australia
Associated Catholic Colleges
Boys' schools in Victoria (Australia)
Essendon, Victoria
Buildings and structures in the City of Moonee Valley